is a Japanese manga series written and illustrated by Toshinori Sogabe. It has been serialized in Akita Shoten's shōnen manga magazine Weekly Shōnen Champion since March 2020.

Publication
Written and illustrated by Toshinori Sogabe, a one-shot chapters of Yankee JK Kuzuhana-chan was first published in Akita Shoten's shōnen manga magazine Weekly Shōnen Champion on October 31, 2019; it began publication as a serialized manga in the same magazine on March 19, 2020. Akita Shoten has collected its chapters into individual tankōbon volumes. The first volume was released on August 6, 2020. As of March 8, 2023, fifteen volumes have been released.

Volume list

References

External links
  
  

Akita Shoten manga
Harem anime and manga
Romantic comedy anime and manga
Shōnen manga
Yankī anime and manga